Joseph Franz von Allioli (10 August, 1793 at Sulzbach, Germany – 22 May, 1873 at Augsburg, Germany), was a Roman Catholic theologian and orientalist. 

Allioli studied theology at Landshut and was ordained at Ratisbon in 1816. From 1818 to 1820, he studied Oriental languages at Vienna, Rome, and Paris. 

He became professor in the University at Landshut in 1824, and was transferred with the university to Munich in 1826. Owing to a weak throat, he had to accept a canonry at Ratisbon in 1835, and became Dean of the chapter at Augsburg, in 1838.

Works
"Aphorismen Über den Zusammenhang der heiligen Schrift Alten und Neuen Testaments, aus der Idee des Reichs Gottes" (Ratisbon 1819)
"Häusliche Alterthümer der Hebräer nebst biblischer Geographie" (1821)
"Biblische Alterthümer" (Landshut, 1825)
"Handbuch der biblischen Alterthumskunde" (in cooperation with Grätz and Haneberg, Landshut, 1843-44)
"Übersetzung der heiligen Schriften Alten und Neuen Testaments, aus der Vulgata, mit Bezug auf den Grundtext, neu übersetzt und mit kurzen Anmerkungen erläutert, dritte Auflage von Allioli umgearbeitet" (6 vols., Nürnberg, 1830-35). This work received a papal approbation, 11 May, 1830. 

1793 births
1873 deaths
19th-century German Catholic theologians
People from Sulzbach-Rosenberg
Members of the Bavarian Chamber of Deputies